In the Dark is a four-part British crime drama that premiered on BBC One from 11 July to 1 August 2017. The series is an adaptation of the Mark Billingham novels, Time of Death and In The Dark. It is written by Danny Brocklehurst and stars MyAnna Buring as detective Helen Weeks. Production and global distribution was handled by BBC Studios.

Synopsis
In the Dark consists of two separate two-part stories centring around detective Helen Weeks. In the first two-parter, Helen finds out that she is pregnant and becomes involved in a case in which the husband of her childhood best friend is accused of kidnapping two young girls. In the second two-parter, a heavily pregnant Helen is pulled into the dark side of urban Manchester as she deals with an unexpected tragedy.

Cast and characters
MyAnna Buring as DI Helen Weeks of the Manchester Metropolitan Police.
Ben Batt as DI Paul Hopkins, Helen's partner and fellow detective in the Greater Manchester  Police.
Emma Fryer as Linda Bates, the wife of Stephen Bates who is the main suspect in the abduction of two young girls.
David Leon as DI Adam Perrin, a detective in the Manchester Metropolitan Police and Helen's former fling
Pearce Quigley as Trevor Hare, the owner of a pub in Helen’s hometown of Polesford. 
Ashley Walters as DI Tim Cornish, a North Derbyshire Police officer leading the abduction case.
Matt King as Phil Hendricks, a forensic scientist.
Jamie Sives as DCI Jack Gosforth, Week's superior at the Manchester Metropolitan Police
Georgia Tennant as Jenny, Helen's sister. Tennant previously portrayed a character named Jenny in the Doctor Who episode "The Doctor's Daughter" (2008).
Sinead Matthews as Paula Days, an old acquaintance from Helen's childhood.
Clive Wood as Robert Weeks, Helen's father.
Jessica Gunning as DC Sophie Carson, the North Derbyshire Police officer on the field in the abduction case.
Kevin Sutton as Gavin Sweeney, Paula's husband.
Tim McInnerny as Frank Linnell
 Eleni Foskett as Charli

Episodes

Production
Filming for the series began in April 2017 in Manchester and Marsden.

Reception
The Daily Telegraphs Michael Hogan gave the first episode three stars out of five, noting that: "In the Dark did show promise and could yet come good. It was taut and tensely atmospheric with an intriguing premise which found its heroine caught in the middle between police and prime suspect."

Reviewing the first episode, The Guardians Sam Wollaston concluded that: "In The Dark is by no means a trope-free zone...But once you have accepted that, it's a crisp opener (of four) – pacy, thoughtful and skilfully constructed, with multiple strands I am eager to see twisted together again."

References

External links

2017 British television series debuts
2017 British television series endings
2010s British crime television series
2010s British drama television series
BBC high definition shows
BBC television dramas
2010s British television miniseries
British crime drama television series
English-language television shows
Television shows based on British novels
Television shows set in Derbyshire
BBC television miniseries
Television series by BBC Studios